Thomas Bracco (born August 8, 1990) is an American actor, reality television star and Broadway performer. He is best known for starring in Newsies as Spot Conlon on Broadway. He was a cast member on season 21 of Big Brother and placed 5th in the competition.

Early life
Thomas Bracco was born in Staten Island, New York City, New York to Phil and Annabelle Bracco. He attended Fiorello H. LaGuardia High School for the Performing Arts. Bracco took acting classes at Chazz Palminteri and dance classes at Star Struck Dance Studio. He was trained at Dale Brown Musical Theatre Intensive.

Career

Broadway
He began his acting debut in the Broadway musical Newsies playing the character Spot Conlon. The Musical premiered at the Paper Mill Playhouse in Millburn, New Jersey and ran from September 25, 2011 through October 16, 2011. It opened again on Broadway at the Nederlander Theatre and ran from March 15, 2012 to August 24, 2014. He reprised his role on Broadway performing in Pretty Woman: The Musical as Giulio. The musical made its world premiere at the Nederlander Theatre in Chicago, Illinois on March 13, 2018. It then made its way onto Broadway on July 20, 2018, and closed on August 18, 2019.

Film and television
Bracco made TV appearances in shows like Submissions Only and The Battery's Down. He made his film debut in a movie called 4th Man Out playing the character Giovanni. He also had a role as a tango dancer in the movie Isn't It Romantic. In 2022, Bracco competed on The Challenge: Ride or Dies with Big Brother 21 houseguest Analyse Talavera as his partner.

Big Brother

Bracco entered the house knowing another houseguest Christie Murphy. It was revealed that Murphy had been in a seven-year relationship with one of  Bracco's relatives, and that they were not entering the house aware of the fact that they'd be competing together.
Murphy won HoH week one keeping Bracco safe from eviction. He quickly formed an eight person alliance with seven other houseguests called "Gr8ful".

In Week 7, right after Jack’s eviction, Tommy won Head of Household. On Day 52, he nominated Cliff and Kathryn for eviction alongside his ally, Christie, who was a special third nominee due to the America’s Field Trip twist. Tommy also won the Week 7 Power of Veto competition and used it to remove Christie from the block. He was not required to name a replacement nominee.

Tommy won the Power of Veto (for the second time) in Week 10 and on Day 76, used the power of Veto on Christie. On Day 79, he was nominated by Nicole in the double eviction alongside Christie, but survived to remain in the house when Christie was evicted by a 3-0 vote. He was eliminated 2-0 against Holly the following week on Jackson's HOH. After the double eviction, Michie won HOH and placed Tommy and Cliff for eviction. Nicole won the Power of Veto and used it on Cliff, forcing Holly to be the replacement nominee. Tommy was evicted with a vote of 2-0, and Tommy being the seventh member of the jury. He voted for Michie to win.

Filmography

Stage

References

External links
 
 
 

1990 births
Living people
21st-century American male actors
American gay actors
American male dancers
American male musical theatre actors
American male stage actors
Big Brother (American TV series) contestants
The Challenge (TV series) contestants